Rafuse is a surname.

List of people with the surname 

 Denise Peterson-Rafuse, Canadian politician
 Earle Rafuse (1930–1998), Canadian politician
 Erin Rafuse (born 1988), Canadian sailor

See also 

 Central Trust Co v Rafuse

Surnames